Rettenbach is a World Cup giant slalom ski course in Austria on Rettenbach glacier above Sölden, Tyrol. Located on Wildspitze mountain in the Ötztal Alps, the race course debuted in 1993.

This course hosted total of 21 World Cup events for men (19th of all-time) and total 24 World Cup events for women (19th of all-time).

World Cup
Since 2000, it is the traditional opener for the World Cup season, with a giant slalom for both genders in late October; previously, it had alternated with Tignes, France, from 1993 on.

The women's race in October 2002 was one of only two triple wins in World Cup history, as Andrine Flemmen (NOR), Nicole Hosp (AUT), and Tina Maze (SLO) shared first place.

This slope is widely regarded as the most difficult giant slalom on the women's circuit, with a maximum gradient of 68.2 percent (34.3 degrees) at "Eisfall".

Course sections 

 "Rettenbachjoch" 
 "Gletschertisch" (Glacier table)
 "Gletscherkante" (Glacier abreuvoir)
 "Eisfall" (Icefall) – the steepest part (68.2%)
 "Gletscherzunge" (Glacier tongue)
 "Elefantentränke" (Elephant potions)

Men's giant slalom

Women's giant slalom

Fatal accidents
On January 5, 2015, two prospects of the United States Ski Team, Ronnie Berlack and Bryce Astle, were killed by an avalanche they triggered near Rettenbach glacier.

On 17 November 2015, Slovenian ex skier Drago Grubelnik died in a car accident on the seventh curve (elevation ) on the road descending to Sölden, not far below the World Cup finish area.

References

External links
FIS Alpine Ski World Cup – Soelden, Austria 
Ski-db.com - Soelden men's races

Glaciers of Austria
Glaciers of the Alps
Ski areas in Austria